Adam Vidjeskog (born 7 July 1998) is a Finnish professional footballer who plays for Kokkolan PV, as a midfielder.

Career
Vidjeskog signed with Kokkolan PV on 15 January 2019. The deal he signed was for one-year, with an option to extended it with further one year.

References

1998 births
Living people
Finnish footballers
FF Jaro players
Jakobstads BK players
Kemi City F.C. players
Kokkolan Palloveikot players
Veikkausliiga players
Ykkönen players
Kakkonen players
Association football midfielders
People from Kronoby
Sportspeople from Ostrobothnia (region)